Fuxing Road is a road in western Beijing, China, forming part of the extended Chang'an Avenue.

The entire road lies within the confines of Haidian District. It is believed to run from Gongzhufen on the West 3rd Ring Road through to the West 5th Ring Road; however, maps indicate its path from Muxidi Bridge (just before the West 3rd Ring Road) to Yuquanlu (just after the West 4th Ring Road).

The Wukesong Indoor Stadium, a venue for the 2008 Summer Olympics, runs alongside the road. The venue has since then been renamed the "MasterCard Center". To the west of Fuxing Road is Shijingshan Road, while to the east of Fuxing Road is Fuxingmen Outer Street. Line 1 of the Beijing subway runs along the route.

Streets in Beijing